Pitumarca District is one of eight districts of the province Canchis in Peru.

Geography 
The Willkanuta mountain range lies in the district. Some of the highest mountains of the district are Chumpi, Chupika, Hatun Uma, Hatun Ñañu Punta, Kuntur Ikiña, Wayruru Punku, Wila Jaqhi, Yana Qaqa and Yayamari. Other mountains are listed below:

The most important rivers are the Ch'illka Mayu and the Yana Mayu, one of its left tributaries, as well as the Chuwa Mayu (Chuamayu). All of them are tributaries of the Willkanuta River.

Siwinaqucha is the largest lake of the district and also one of the largest lakes of Peru.

Ethnic groups 
The people in the district are mainly indigenous citizens of Quechua descent. Quechua is the language which the majority of the population (95.17%) learnt to speak in childhood, 4.77% of the residents started speaking using the Spanish language (2007 Peru Census).

See also 
 Machu Pitumarka

References

External links